Bois-Franc is a future Réseau express métropolitain (REM) interchange station in the Bois-Franc neighbourhood of Montreal, Quebec, Canada. REM service is expected to begin at the station in the fourth quarter of 2024.

It was formerly commuter rail station on the Deux-Montagnes line until Exo ended service in 2020.

Origin of name
Bois-Franc takes its name from the nearby Bois-Franc residential development, itself named for chemin du Bois-Franc, the original name of the stretch of boulevard Henri-Bourassa through this area, which had previously ended at the Laurentian Autoroute. Bois Franc was also the original name of the nearby pioneer airstrip that later was known as Cartierville Airport, until its closing in the 1980s.

History
The original station was named Lazard (likely for the Franco-American merchant bank Lazard Frères & Co. which underwrote the construction of the Mount Royal Tunnel on this rail line). In 1926, the station was renamed Val-Royal. After the modernization of the Deux-Montagnes Line, between 1993 and 1995, a new station named Bois-Franc was built; the original station was then demolished at the request of the Canadian National Railway and with the permission of Transport Canada on June 5, 1995.  The old station site is now a parking lot on the east side of Boulevard Marcel-Laurin.

Location
The station is located at 5465 Henri Bourassa Boulevard West, between Marcel-Laurin Boulevard/Boulevard Laurentien (Route 117) and Grenet Street in Saint-Laurent on the border with Cartierville.

Cartierville branch and station 
A single-track electrified (2400 V DC) branch to Cartierville, a relic of when the line terminated there in Canadian Northern Railway days, left the line at (then) Val-Royal station. When the line was run by Canadian National, only one rush-hour trip was scheduled in each direction. It was abandoned in the early 1980s when STM predecessor STCUM took over operations of the Deux-Montagnes line. The Cartierville station was located at the corner of Gouin West and Laurentian boulevards. The Cartierville Station was to have been the terminus of Line 3 (Red) of the Montreal Metro.

Connecting bus routes

See also 
 Montreal Metro future projects
 Orange Line west branch extension

References

External links
 Bois-Franc Commuter Train Station Information (RTM)
 Bois-Franc Commuter Train Station Schedule (RTM)
 2016 STM System Map
 STL 2011 map

Former Exo commuter rail stations
Railway stations in Montreal
Saint-Laurent, Quebec
1994 establishments in Quebec
Railway stations in Canada opened in 1994
Réseau express métropolitain railway stations